Porto Conte Lighthouse is an active lighthouse located on a promontory, halfway on the east side of the bay of Porto Conte, opposite to Capo Caccia Lighthouse and west of Alghero on the Sea of Sardinia.

Description

See also
 List of lighthouses in Italy

References

External links

 Servizio Fari Marina Militare

Lighthouses in Italy
Buildings and structures in Sardinia